Lee Eun-ji (11 December 1989, Gyeonggi) is a South Korean track cyclist. At the 2012 Summer Olympics, she competed in the Women's team sprint with Lee Hye-Jin for the national team.

Major results
2015
Japan Track Cup
3rd Keirin
3rd Keirin
3rd Keirin, Yangyang International Track Competition

References

South Korean female cyclists
Living people
Olympic cyclists of South Korea
Cyclists at the 2012 Summer Olympics
South Korean track cyclists
Cyclists at the 2010 Asian Games
Cyclists at the 2014 Asian Games

1989 births
Sportspeople from Gyeonggi Province
Asian Games competitors for South Korea
20th-century South Korean women
21st-century South Korean women